Lucini may refer to:

People
 Anton Francesco Lucini (born c. 1610), Florentine engraver
 José Roberto Lucini (born 1981), known as Zé Roberto, Brazilian footballer
 Giovanni Battista Lucini (1639–1686), Italian painter

Fiction
 Ben Lucini, a character on the Australian soap opera Home and Away
 Carly Lucini (née Morris), a character from the Australian soap opera Home and Away

See also
 Lusiny, a village in Gmina Bartoszyce, Warmian-Masurian Voivodeship, Poland

Italian-language surnames